

La Plata station is an Amtrak train station in La Plata, Missouri, United States and is a passenger stop for Amtrak's Southwest Chief long-distance route between Chicago and Los Angeles. It was built in 1945 by the Atchison, Topeka and Santa Fe Railway as a replacement for an 1887-built, 1888-opened passenger and freight depot that was in deteriorating condition. Efforts to replace the station were stalled by a lack of construction material during World War II. The 1945 replacement was built in Art Deco style, and was restored between 1996 and 2001 by local preservationists, a model railroad club, and a garden club. The station was upgraded again in 2022 with upgrades done to the station building and the platform to bring it into compliance with the Americans with Disabilities Act. It also hosts a Virtual Railfan camera.

Nearby colleges
 Truman State University, north  in Kirksville.
 A.T. Still University, north  in Kirksville.
 Moberly Area Community College, south  in Moberly.

References

External links

 La Plata Amtrak Station (USA Rail Guide – TrainWeb)
 Trails and Rails

Amtrak stations in Missouri
Atchison, Topeka and Santa Fe Railway stations
Buildings and structures in Macon County, Missouri
Art Deco architecture in Missouri
Railway stations in the United States opened in 1888
1888 establishments in Missouri